Fly Channel is a generalist television channel broadcast by Italian  broadcaster Europa 7 HD on digital terrestrial television in Italy.

It was launched at 3:00 PM on October 11, 2010. Its first programming included news reports by journalist Udo Gümpel, a weekly analysis of the main news topic of the week and some interviews.

In the months after the launch, the programming was expanded to host prominent journalists and comedians.

References

Italian-language television stations
Television channels and stations established in 2010
Television channels in Italy